Western Samoa have played in every Rugby World Cup since the 1991 Rugby World Cup. Their omission from the inaugural tournament in 1987 was controversial, as there were no qualifications. Their worst World Cups were in 2007, 2015 and 2019 when they finished fourth in their pool.

By position
 1987 Rugby World Cup Not invited
 1991 Rugby World Cup Eliminated in quarter finals
 1995 Rugby World Cup Eliminated in quarter finals
 1999 Rugby World Cup Eliminated in quarter final playoffs
 2003 Rugby World Cup Eliminated in pool stages
 2007 Rugby World Cup Eliminated in pool stages
 2011 Rugby World Cup Eliminated in pool stages
 2015 Rugby World Cup Eliminated in pool stages
 2019 Rugby World Cup Eliminated in pool stages

By match

1991 Rugby World Cup

Pool 3 matches –

Quarter final

1995 Rugby World Cup

Pool B games –

Quarter finals –

1999 Rugby World Cup

Pool D games –

Quarter final playoffs –

2003 Rugby World Cup

Pool C matches –

2007 Rugby World Cup

Pool A matches –

2011 Rugby World Cup

Pool D matches

2015 Rugby World Cup

Pool B

2019 Rugby World Cup

Pool A

Hosting
So far Western Samoa has not hosted any World Cup games, and has not put in bids for future tournaments. Due to the lack of facilities, and the small size of the island nation, it is unlikely it will do so in the future.

Portrayal on screen
Samoa can be seen playing South Africa in the feature film Invictus based on the 1995 Rugby World Cup.

See also

 National team appearances in the Rugby World Cup

References
 Davies, Gerald (2004) The History of the Rugby World Cup (Sanctuary Publishing Ltd,
 Farr-Jones, Nick, (2003). Story of the Rugby World Cup, Australian Post Corporation,

Related Websites 
 Manu Samoa Supporters website
 Pacific Islanders Rugby Teams supporters website

Samoa national rugby union team
Rugby World Cup by nation